Bay Shore Union Free School District or Bay Shore Schools is a school district headquartered in Bay Shore, New York.

In 2015 Joseph C. Bond became the interim superintendent; he previously was superintendent of the Brentwood Union Free School District.

Graduates of Woodhull School (PK-6) of the Fire Island School District can attend Bay Shore secondary schools.

In 2019 the district acquired electric school buses.

District area
The Bay Shore UFSD serves most of Bay Shore, West Bay Shore, and North Bay Shore, with some portions served by neighboring school districts. Bay Shore School District colors are Maroon and White and the mascot is the Marauder.

Schools
 Five elementary schools
 Mary G. Clarkson, grades Pre-K–2
 Brook Avenue School, grades Pre-K–2
 Fifth Avenue School, grades Pre-K–2
 Gardiner Manor School, grades 3–5 (located in West Bay Shore)
 South Country School, grades 3–5 (located in West Bay Shore)
One middle school
 Bay Shore Middle School, grades 6–8
One high school
 Bay Shore High School, grades 9–12. Bay Shore High School offers extensive AP courses, and became an official International Baccalaureate (IB) school in December 2008.

References

External links
 Bay Shore Schools

School districts in New York (state)
Education in Suffolk County, New York
Islip (town), New York